The Handball Federation of Yugoslavia was the governing body of team handball in SFR Yugoslavia. It was formed in 1949.

It organized the national team and a national championship.

Successor federations
Handball Federation of Bosnia and Herzegovina
Croatian Handball Federation
Handball Federation of Kosovo
Macedonian Handball Federation
Handball Federation of Montenegro
Handball Federation of Serbia
Handball Federation of Slovenia

 
Sports governing bodies in Yugoslavia